Jason Kent (born 21 April 1980) is an Australian former professional rugby league footballer.

Background
Kent was born in Sydney, New South Wales, Australia.

Career
He has played for the Leigh Centurions in the Super League competition as well as for the Cronulla Sharks and the St George Illawarra Dragons in the National Rugby League competition.

References

External links 
Jason Kent Official Player Profile

1980 births
Living people
Australian rugby league players
St. George Illawarra Dragons players
Cronulla-Sutherland Sharks players
Leigh Leopards players
Rugby league halfbacks
Rugby league players from Lithgow, New South Wales